Polynesia curtitibia is a moth in the family Geometridae. It is found in the north-eastern Himalayas, Thailand and on Borneo. The habitat consists of lowland and upper montane forests.

Adults have primrose-yellow wings marked with punctate red fasciae.

References

Moths described in 1922
Asthenini